Vodafone Telekomünikasyon Anonim Şirketi or Vodafone Turkey is a Turkish mobile telecommunications company. It was formed when Telsim, which was founded by the Uzan Group, was incorporated into Vodafone group on 28 December 2005. On 24 May 2006 Telsim brand name was changed into Vodafone Turkey. Incorporated by the Vodafone Group, one of the biggest international mobile communication companies of the world in terms of revenues, Vodafone Turkey is the second biggest mobile communication company of Turkey with 20.6 million users as of 11 November 2014, an increase of 105,000 customers from the fourth quarter of 2011. As the second biggest direct international investment of Turkey, the total investment of Vodafone Turkey, including the acquisitions, since 2006 has exceeded TL 11 billion.  

Vodafone Turkey operates in 81 cities of Turkey with its approximately more than 3300 employees, more than 1200 stores, 23 thousand points of sale and a stakeholder family of 53 thousand people..

Vodafone Turkey also provides IPTV service in Turkey.

See also
Vodafone
KKTC Telsim

References

External links
 Vodafone Turkey

Vodafone
Telecommunications companies of Turkey
Companies based in Istanbul
Telecommunications companies established in 1994